Magic Boy may refer to:
Magic Boy (film), a Japanese animated film
Magic Boy (video game), a video game
Magic Boy Kitchener, a Chinese animated series
Magical boy, a subgenre of Japanese fantasy media